Rapa is a genus of sea snails, marine gastropod mollusks in the family Muricidae, the murex snails or rock snails.

Species
Species within the genus Rapa include:

 Rapa bulbiformis Sowerby, 1870
 Rapa bulbosa 
 Rapa incurvus (Dunker, 1852)
 Rapa papyracea (Lamarck, 1822)
 Rapa penardi Montroux
 Rapa rapa

References

 
Coralliophilinae